The 2005 World Solar Challenge was one of a biennial series of solar-powered car races, covering about  through the Australian Outback, from Darwin, Northern Territory to Adelaide, South Australia.

Three teams completed the course out of 12 that started. The winner was a Nuna car built by Nuon of the Netherlands.

Results

References

 WSC history page

Solar car races
Scientific organisations based in Australia
Science competitions
Photovoltaics
Recurring sporting events established in 1987